Kuch Kuch Locha Hai, previously titled Patel Rap, is a 2015 Bollywood comedy film directed by Devang Dholakia and starring Sunny Leone, Ram Kapoor, Evelyn Sharma and Navdeep Chhabra in lead roles. The film is loosely inspired by the Gujarati comedy play Lage Raho Gujjubhai starring and directed by Siddharth Randeria. The film is presented by Magic Pictures and Entertainment Pvt Ltd. Asha Jhaveri is the associate producer of the film. The film marked the debut of actor Navdeep Chhabra. It was released on 8 May 2015. It received mostly negative reviews. The movie title can easily be confused with Kuch Kuch Hota Hai which was released in 1998.

Plot 
Praveen Patel (Ram Kapoor) is a 45-year-old Gujarati NRI store-owner living with his wife Kokila (Suchita Trivedi) and an ambitious 26-year-old son Jigar (Navdeep Chhabra) in Kuala Lumpur. Though he loves his wife, he is often annoyed by her over-religious and sometimes dominating nature. Patel has an enormous fascination for a Bollywood actress named Shanaya Khanna (Sunny Leone) and he avidly watches her movies, in privacy though.

Jigar is in love with their neighbor Naina (Evelyn Sharma). He is an aspiring musician and wants to marry her, but Kokila doesn't approve her as Naina is "too modern" and she wants a "traditional, homely Gujarati" daughter-in-law.

Destiny brings Shanaya from Mumbai to Kuala Lumpur, where she is the "prize" for Valentine's Day competition, and the winner of the contest gets a date with her. For Patel, this is his dream come true moment that he has been waiting for his entire life. He leaves no stone unturned to win the contest and eventually succeeds and secures a date with Shanaya. Before leaving for Kuala Lumpur, Shanaya signs a movie playing the role of a "middle-class Gujarati wife" and in order to do proper justice to the role, her director, Mac Mundra (Ivan Rodrigues), advises her to live with a Gujarati family for a while to bring her role to life. While Patel is on a date with Shanaya, she considers living with Patel's family for a few days, as Patel lies to her he lives just with his father and also lies that he's not married yet.

Patel makes Jigar as his fake father and Jigar gets Naina to be Patel's fake mother. Patel fakes a family emergency back home in India and puts Kokila on the first flight back to India before Shanaya's arrival to his house. Shanaya finally comes to live with Patel's family. Patel cherishes every moment she spends in his house, profoundly flirting and getting affectionate towards her.

One night, when Patel is dancing in the rain with Shanaya, Kokila suddenly arrives home, while Patel is unaware that she's back in the house. Next morning, Patel's friend brings a "Kenyan" woman to his house, who could teach garba to Shanaya. She is, in fact, Kokila in disguise, and Patel fails to recognize her. Meanwhile, Patel gets possessive and jealous as he feels Shanaya is ignoring him and spending more time with her co-actor. When Patel notices Shanaya grooving to music with a band, he gets extremely upset and bawls at her, "When you have time to do all this, you have time for parties, you have time for your co-actor, why don't you have the time for me? Have you ever asked me if I’m okay or not, even once?"Shanaya feels insulted and gets outraged, and packs her suitcase to leave his house. She explains, "If we were together, would you be able to adjust to the lifestyle of an actress. Would you be able to control yourself when people stare at me? No. Because you’re insecure. It takes a strong, secure man to marry an actress." She leaves the house.

When Patel gets back from work, he is surprised to see a wedding is being arranged for him and he is groom. He is very confused and assumes he will soon marry Shanaya. Shanaya gets that "Kenyan" woman and asks Patel to marry her. Patel confesses that he lied to her and tells her that he can't marry her or that "Kenyan" woman. He says, "I’m already married. I love my wife very much. Please forgive me." The "Kenyan" woman reveals that she's Kokila and Shanaya explains that they set up this entire situation, when Kokila returned to the house. Jigar and Naina get engaged on that occasion. When Shanaya gets ready to leave, she says, "(Living with you), I’ve learnt more about life, than my role."

Cast 
 Ram Kapoor as Praveen Patel (P. P.)
 Sunny Leone as Shanaya Khanna, an actress
 Evelyn Sharma as Naina Talwar (Jigar's fiancé)
 Navdeep Chhabra as Jigar Patel (Naina's fiancé)
 Suchita Trivedi as Kokila Patel (P. P.'s wife)
 Ivan Rodrigues as Film director Mac Mundra
 Mahendra Tambe as Vivek Hinduja
 Mehul Buch as Velji, P. P.'s best friend
 Kurush Deboo as Nauzer Daruwalla, P. P.'s best friend
 Avantika Khatri as Jacqueline

Filming 
Shooting for the film was to begin in late September, but because of the illness of the director, Dholakia, the filming was postponed. The cast and crew finally started the shoot from 12 November 2014 in Malaysia.

Soundtrack

Reception

Critical reception
Upon release, the film was panned by critics. Renuka Vyavahare of the Times of India gave it one star and said, "You either have a sense of humour or you don't. If you try too hard to sound funny, it never works and that's the case here [...] the jaded film fails to keep you awake, let alone entertain, as it lacks a decent story and fails on multiple grounds. After all, the concept of young people dressing up as oldies is no longer funny or probably works in plays better." Giving the film 0.5 out of 5, Sonil Dedhia and Hitesh Harisinghnai of Rediff.com said the film is nothing but a cleavage fest and it would make perfect sense to give this film a miss, unless you are into bikinis and Gujju stereotypes.
Akshay Kaushal of IBN Live gave the film 0.5 out of 5 and said, "Kuch Kuch Locha Hai guarantees to kill you of boredom.." He also criticized the poor performances of the cast, particularly that of debutant Navdeep Chhabra. Likewise, Rohit Vats of the Hindustan Times gave the film 0.5 and remarked, "Kuch Kuch Locha Hai is an insane, bizarre film with absolutely no intention of making the audience satiated in any which manner. Avoid it if you can. As far as the Sunny Leone fans are concerned, YouTube also has those songs."

Rahul Desai of Bangalore Mirror gave a rating of one and opined, "This is the kind of seedy effort that makes me wonder if director Dholakia wrapped up shooting every night, met friends at a bar and cackled at lewd jokes about which body part got maximum screen time. Before another male director has Leone play a nurse so that innuendos revolve around body exams and instruments, I suggest a blanket ban on bananas and Indian sex comedies."

References

External links
 

2015 films
Films shot in Malaysia
2010s Hindi-language films
Indian sex comedy films
2010s sex comedy films
Films scored by Ikka
Films scored by Amjad Nadeem
2015 comedy films